Zvi Hendel (born 16 October 1949) is an Israeli politician who served as a member of the Knesset for the Tkuma faction of the National Union between 1996 and 2009.

Biography
Born in Transylvania in Romania, Hendel made aliyah in 1959 and in his military service he served as a Gadna instructor. In his reserve duty he served as part of a reconnaissance unit in the Israeli Artillery Corps and took part in the Yom Kippur War.

In 1977, he moved with his family to the Israeli settlement of Ganei Tal, part of the Gush Katif bloc in the Gaza Strip.

Political career
In the early 1990s, Hendel was elected to the head of the Hof Aza Regional Council, and was first elected to the 14th Knesset in 1996 as a National Religious Party representative. Towards the end of his term, he left the party along with Hanan Porat and formed the "Emunim" faction, which soon after changed its name to Tkuma. As part the Tkuma party, he joined the National Union list, and was elected to the fifteenth, sixteenth, and seventeenth Knessets.

In the 15th Knesset, he served as chairman of the Aliyah, Absorption, and Diaspora committee.

During Ariel Sharon's second term as Prime Minister of Israel, Hendel served as Deputy Minister of Education, Culture, and Sports until the National Union party was dismissed from the coalition on 6 June 2004 prior to a vote on the disengagement plan.

A significant part of his parliamentary career was devoted to efforts for the residents of Gush Katif (where he himself resided), and strengthening the right wing in the Knesset. In this context, he also coined the phrase "כעומק החקירה, כך עומק העקירה" ("As deep the investigation is, so is the uprooting"), commenting on the legal investigations ongoing against Sharon at the same time Sharon changed his political views and decided on the Disengagement Plan.

Hendel also served as head of the Agricultural caucus in the Knesset.

In 2005, Hendel was evicted from his home along with fellow residents of Ganei Tal as part of the Disengagement Plan. Him and his family's dealing with the eviction was the subject of the documentaries "Katif", and "Last Katif".

In 2006, Hendel submitted a bill proposal that would tie an oath of loyalty to "a Jewish and democratic Israel" and to the laws of Israel, to the right to vote. The Bill was turned down by a vote of 45-17.

He lost his seat in the 2009 elections.

After Knesset, he became the head of the Israel Anti-Drug Authority. In this role, he vigorously opposed cannabis legalization and was criticized for a dispute with Knesset member Tamar Zandberg.

References

External links

Zvi Hendel Israel Ministry of Foreign Affairs

1949 births
Living people
Romanian Jews
Romanian emigrants to Israel
National Religious Party politicians
Religious Zionist Party leaders
National Union (Israel) politicians
Members of the 14th Knesset (1996–1999)
Members of the 15th Knesset (1999–2003)
Members of the 16th Knesset (2003–2006)
Members of the 17th Knesset (2006–2009)